LCPM may refer to:
 Least-cost planning methodology
 Life cycle project management
 Linear pulse-code modulation
 Liquid crystal phase modulator
 Low-Cost Planetary Missions Conference
 Low complexity parallel multiplier